Warren Township is a township in Lake County, Illinois, USA. As of the 2020 census, its population was 65,883. The cities of Gurnee, Park City, and Grayslake lie within its borders. The township was established in 1850 by settlers who came from the town of Warren, New York. Both were named in honor of Major General Joseph Warren, killed at the Battle of Bunker Hill.

Geography
Lakes in this township include Gages Lake, Grandwood Lake, Twin Lakes and Valley Lake.

Cities and towns
 Grayslake (east portion)
 Gurnee (entirety)
 Lake Villa (east-most portions)
 Libertyville (northeast corner)
 Lindenhurst (US-45 business plaza area)
 Old Mill Creek (south quarter)
 Park City (west half)
 Third Lake (east third)
 Wadsworth (south part)
 Waukegan (far west area)

Census-designated place 
 Gages Lake CDP
 Grandwood Park CDP

Adjacent townships
 Newport Township (north)
 Benton Township (northeast)
 Waukegan Township (east)
 Shields Township (southeast)
 Libertyville Township (south)
 Fremont Township (southwest)
 Avon Township (west)
 Lake Villa Township (west)

Cemeteries
The township contains seven cemeteries: Highland Memorial Park, Sant Sava Monastery, Serbian Monastery, Spaulding, Spaulding Corners, Swan Family and Warren.

Major highways
 Interstate 94
 U.S. Route 41
 U.S. Route 45
 Illinois Route 21
 Illinois Route 43
 Illinois Route 120
 Illinois Route 131
 Illinois Route 132

Airports and landing strips
 O John Clark RLA Airport (historical)

Railroad lines
 The Milwaukee Road

Demographics
As of the 2020 census, there were 65,883 people living in the township. The population density was approximately 1,800/sq mi (690/km2). There were 25,853 housing units. The racial makeup of the township was 55.8% White, 12.2% Asian, 9.1% Black or African American, 0.9% American Indian or Alaska Native, 0.1% Native Hawaiian or Pacific Islander, 10.8% from other races, and 11.2% from two or more races. Hispanic or Latino of any race were 22.8% of the population.

The median age in the township was 38.8 years. 23.4% of the population was under 18 years, and 10.8% were 65 years and over.

There were 25,747 households, out of which 28.5% had people under the age of 18 living with them and 27.7% had people 65 years and older living with them. 54% of households were married couples living together, 23.5% had a female householder with no spouse present, 13.1% had a male householder with no spouse present, and 9.3% were cohabiting couples living together. The average household size was 2.54 and the average family size was 3.10.

The median income for a household in the township was $86,649, and the median income for a family was $116,845. 7.4% of residents were below the poverty line.

References

External links
 Warren Township official website.
 US-Counties.com
 City-Data.com
 US Census
 Illinois State Archives
 U.S. Board on Geographic Names (GNIS)
 United States Census Bureau cartographic boundary files

Townships in Lake County, Illinois
Townships in Illinois